Arrow character may refer to:

 Arrow (symbol), graphical symbols like → and ←
 List of Arrow characters, characters appearing in the television series Arrow